Roger Paul Schurig (born April 3, 1942) was an American basketball player.

Schurig, originally from St. Louis, Missouri, played college basketball at Vanderbilt University from 1963 through 1965. Schurig's exploits at Vanderbilt included winning multiple games with last-second clutch shots, including one against Southeastern Conference powerhouse Kentucky in 1963.

Schurig later played professional basketball for the Houston Mavericks of the American Basketball Association before the ABA-NBA merger.

References

External links 
 BasketballReference.com Roger Schurig page
 Article on the Vanderbilt Commodores basketball team including Schurig's last second heroics

1942 births
Living people
Basketball players from St. Louis
Houston Mavericks players
Point guards
Vanderbilt Commodores men's basketball players
American men's basketball players